Ovinius Camillus was allegedly a Roman usurper during the rule of Alexander Severus. Most scholars today consider him to be fictitious.

According to the unreliable Historia Augusta Ovinius Camillus was a senator from an ancient family, who conspired against the Emperor. The plot is however uncovered, but the usurper is, surprisingly, spared by Alexander Severus and even offered to rule alongside the Emperor.

References

Historia Augusta
Jean Béranger, "SHA Alex. Sev. 48,1 et la cura rei publicae.“ In: Gerhard Wirth et al. (Hrsg.), Romanitas, Christianitas: Untersuchungen zur Geschichte und Literatur der römischen Kaiserzeit. Berlin 1982, p. 308–323. .
William George Smith, "Dictionary of Greek and Roman Biography and Mythology", 1849, p. 74.

External links
Also the Internet Archive has a derivative work:

3rd-century Roman usurpers
Ovinii